French Lake is an unincorporated community in French Lake Township, Wright County, Minnesota, United States, near Annandale and Cokato.  The community is located near the junction of Wright County Roads 3 and 37.

References

Unincorporated communities in Minnesota
Unincorporated communities in Wright County, Minnesota